Dupthob is a Bhutanese politician who has been a member of the National Assembly of Bhutan, since October 2018. Previously, he was a member of the National Assembly of Bhutan from 2013 to 2018.

Education and personal life
He holds a Bachelor of Commerce from Sherubtse College. He is married and has a son.

Political career
He was elected to the National Assembly of Bhutan as a candidate of DPT from Boomdeling-Jamkhar constituency in 2013 Bhutanese National Assembly election.

He was re-elected to the National Assembly of Bhutan as a candidate of DPT from Boomdeling-Jamkhar constituency in 2018 Bhutanese National Assembly election. He received 3541 votes and defeated Sangay Dorji, a candidate of DNT.

References

1978 births
Living people
Bhutanese MNAs 2018–2023
21st-century Bhutanese politicians
Druk Phuensum Tshogpa politicians
Bhutanese politicians
Bhutanese MNAs 2013–2018
Sherubtse College alumni
Druk Phuensum Tshogpa MNAs